Taqiyatas (Karakalpak: Тақыятас, Taqiyatas) is a city in Karakalpakstan in Uzbekistan. It is the seat of Taqiyatas district. In 2016, its population was 47,500.

References

Populated places in Karakalpakstan
Cities in Uzbekistan